The Glens Falls Tigers (formerly the Glens Falls White Sox) were an American minor league baseball team from Glens Falls, New York that played in the Eastern League from 1980 until 1988, the team's ballpark was East Field Stadium. The team was founded in 1980 as the Glens Falls White Sox, the Double-A affiliate of the Chicago White Sox. In 1986, the team affiliated with the Detroit Tigers and changed the team name to Glens Falls Tigers to  reflect the new affiliation. After the 1988 season, the franchise moved to London, Ontario and became the London Tigers in 1989. The franchise finally relocated to Trenton, New Jersey as the Trenton Thunder in 1994, Trenton Thunder Baseball are now members of the collegiate summer baseball MLB Draft League.

References

Defunct Eastern League (1938–present) teams
Chicago White Sox minor league affiliates
Detroit Tigers minor league affiliates
Defunct baseball teams in New York (state)
Professional baseball teams in New York (state)
Baseball teams disestablished in 1988
Baseball teams established in 1980